Armen Martirosyan  (sometimes spelt Martirosian, Martirossyan or Martirossian) held the post of Armenia's Deputy Foreign Minister. He was also a two-term member of the National Assembly of Armenia.

Martirossian presented his credentials as Permanent Representative (or ambassador) to the United Nations for Armenia to the Secretary-General of the United Nations on 12 June 2003, replacing the former ambassador, Movses Abelian.

Martirossian announced recently that he would be holding a series of talks around Europe detailing his career so far. These are set to begin on May 6.

External links

Armenian Mission to the United Nations
Article on Martirossian visiting the Armenian Prelacy

Permanent Representatives of Armenia to the United Nations
Members of the National Assembly (Armenia)
Living people
Ambassadors of Armenia to Germany
Ambassadors of Armenia to India
1961 births